Romy Farah Maksoud (born 5 January 1985) is a Colombian former professional tennis player.

Biography
Born to Lebanese parents in Beirut, Farah moved to Colombia at the age of two, via Canada. She grew up in the city of Cali. Her father Patrick coached tennis and comes from a generation of tennis players, while her mother Eva was a volleyball player who captained Lebanon's national team. She is the elder sister of tennis player Robert Farah.

Farah, a right-handed player, competed briefly on the professional tour while a junior, twice featuring in the singles main draw of the Copa Colsanitas WTA Tour tournament, in 2002 and 2003. She appeared in a total of eight Fed Cup ties for Colombia, which included a World Group fixture in 2003 against France. Retiring in 2004, Farah went on to play college tennis in the United States, for Clemson University and the University of Miami.

ITF finals

Singles: 1 (0–1)

Doubles: 4 (0–4)

See also
List of Colombia Fed Cup team representatives

References

External links
 
 
 

1985 births
Living people
Colombian female tennis players
Colombian people of Lebanese descent
Sportspeople from Beirut
Sportspeople from Cali
Clemson Tigers women's tennis players
Miami Hurricanes women's tennis players
Sportspeople of Lebanese descent